Elroy may refer to:

Places in the United States
 Elroy, North Carolina, a census-designated place
 Elroy, Pennsylvania, a village in Franconia Township, Montgomery County, Pennsylvania
 Elroy, Texas, an unincorporated community
 Elroy, Wisconsin, a city

People and fictional characters
 Elroy (given name)

See also
 McElroy